MacNeille or McNeile may refer to:

MacNeille
Tress MacNeille (born 1951), American voice actress
Holbrook Mann MacNeille (1907–1973), American mathematician

McNeile
Ethel McNeile (1875–1922), British missionary and headmistress
H. C. McNeile (1888–1937), British writer, who published under the pen name "Sapper"
Hugh M'Neile (1795–1879), Anglican churchman in Ireland

As middle name
William Macneile Dixon (1866–1946), British author and academic
John MacNeile Price (1843–1922), British civil engineer and the Surveyor General of Hong Kong

See also
Clan MacNeil, a Scottish clan
McNeil (disambiguation)
McNeill (disambiguation)
MacNeil
MacNeill
McNeal
MacNeal

Surnames
Clan MacNeil